Daniel Maddy-Weitzman (born 14 November 1986, in Tel Aviv, Israel) is an Israeli baseball player who is one of the few Israeli-born players to play at the NCAA level.

Playing career

College
Maddy-Weitzman graduated from Haverford College in Pennsylvania in 2012, where he played on the varsity D3 baseball team for 4 years.

Israel Baseball League
Maddy-Weitzman started his career with the Ra'anana Express and is a product of the Israel Association of Baseball farm system. He played for the Ra'anana Express in the 2007 Israel Baseball League season as a pitcher and outfielder, and threw a 7 inning CG win against Netanya Tigers to end the regular season.

Minor League Baseball
During the 2015 season, Maddy-Weitzman played for the Downtown Bulls in the New York City Metro Baseball League and batted .304 with 21 RBIs and 22 SB in 19 games. Maddy-Weitzman was chosen to the all-star game.

Team Israel
He was chosen several times to accompany the Israel national baseball and softballs teams to international tournaments in Europe and the United States.

Maddy-Weitzman competed for Israel during the qualifier for the 2010 European Baseball Championship. During the opening game, against Bulgaria, Maddy-Weitzman started in right field and batted 5th, going 0 for 4 with 4 strike outs, and got a RBI on a sacrifice fly. During the second game, against Croatia, he once against started in right field, and batted 7th, going 0 for 3 with 3 strike outs before being pinch hit for by Dan Rothem. During the third game, against Serbia, he did not start, however he entered the game in the 8th inning as a defensive replacement in right field, and went 0 for 1. During the fourth and final game, against Lithuania, he got the start in right field, going 0 for 4 with a strike out, and finished the qualifier with a .000 batting average.

References

1986 births
Living people
Israeli baseball players
Israeli Jews
Jewish baseball players
Haverford College alumni
Israeli expatriates in the United States
People from Ra'anana